Majma‘ al-Bayan fi-Tafsir al-Qur'an is a tafsir by the 12th century Imami scholar and author Shaykh Tabarsi. 

This commentary is a comprehensive classical tafsir. Tabarsi was a man of great erudition. He was a master of Arabic and a noted theologian and jurist.
The work is considered one of the most authoritative Imami Qur'an commentaries. Al-Tabrisi's method is to take up one group of verses at a time and discuss qira’at, language and grammar before providing a detailed commentary on the text, based on both Sunni and Shi‘i sources and incorporating his own views. His commentary for each passages are divided into five sections: introductory discourse, reading guide, language discourse, revelation and circumstances surrounding it, and meaning

Majma' al-bayan is written after Al-Tibbyan Fi Tafsir al-Quran and is clearly dependent on it.

Grand Ayatollah Mohammad Taqi al-Modarresi's Tafsir Hedayat, an eighteen volume exegesis on the Quran published in Arabic in Iran in the 1980s, is in part a discussion of Majma‘ al-bayan.

References

External links
 Tafseer Majma' al-Bayan

Shia tafsir